Rabbit Run is a tributary of Turkey Creek in Scioto County, Ohio in the United States.

Statistics
The Geographic Name Information System I.D. is 1044837.

References

Rivers of Ohio